Sogo is a department store chain that operates an extensive network of branches, primarily in Japan.

Sogo may also refer to:

Companies and organizations
 Hotel Sogo, a hotel chain in the Philippines
 NHK General TV, known as NHK Sōgō in Japanese
 Pacific Sogo, a department store chain in Taiwan and mainland China
 SOGo, an open source collaborative software server
 Sogo Hong Kong, department stores in Hong Kong and China
 Sogo & Seibu, a Japanese retail company
 Sogo shosha, Japanese general trading companies
 Sogou, traded on the NYSE as SOGO, an internet company in China

People
 Shinji Sogō (1884–1981), president of Japanese National Railways
 Sogō Kazumasa (1532–1561), Japanese samurai
 Sōgo Ishii (born 1957), Japanese film director

Other uses
 Sogo, a fictional city in Barbarella (comics)
Sogo, a small Korean hand drum